One Woman's Experience, also known as One Woman's Story, was a DuMont Television Network anthology TV show created and produced by Lawrence Menkin (1911-2000) and starring Wendy Waldron.

The show aired from October 6, 1952 to April 3, 1953, Mondays through Fridays from 2:45pm to 3pm ET. The 15-minute show aired alongside another 15-minute Menkin show One Man's Experience which aired at 2:30pm ET. Some sources suggest that these episodes were also aired during the DuMont series Monodrama Theater which aired at 11pm ET from May 1952 until December 7, 1953.

Episode status
As with many DuMont series, no episodes are known to exist.

See also
List of programs broadcast by the DuMont Television Network
List of surviving DuMont Television Network broadcasts
1952–53 United States network television schedule (weekday)

References

Bibliography
David Weinstein, The Forgotten Network: DuMont and the Birth of American Television (Philadelphia: Temple University Press, 2004) 
Alex McNeil, Total Television, Fourth edition (New York: Penguin Books, 1980) 
Tim Brooks and Earle Marsh, The Complete Directory to Prime Time Network TV Shows, Third edition (New York: Ballantine Books, 1964)

External links
One Woman's Experience at IMDB
CTVA entry
DuMont historical website

DuMont Television Network original programming
1952 American television series debuts
1953 American television series endings
1950s American anthology television series
Black-and-white American television shows
Lost television shows